Sodium polonide is a radioactive chemical compound with the formula Na2Po. This salt is a polonide, a set of very chemically stable compounds of polonium. Due to the difference in electronegativity (ΔEN) between sodium and polonium (≈ 1.1 under the Pauling system) and the slight non-metallic character of polonium, it is intermediate between intermetallic phases and ionic compounds.

Production
This salt may be produced from the reaction between aqueous hydrogen polonide and sodium metal:

H2Po + 2 Na → Na2Po + H2

This method of synthesis is hampered by the chemical instability of hydrogen polonide.

Sodium polonide may also be produced by heating sodium and polonium together at 300–400 °C.

Crystal structure
Like lithium polonide and potassium polonide, sodium polonide has the antifluorite structure.

References

Sodium compounds
Polonides
Fluorite crystal structure